The 2008 Palmer Cup was held on 26–27 June 2008 on the Gailes Links in Irvine, North Ayrshire, Scotland. Europe won 14–10.

Format
On Thursday, there were four matches of four-ball in the morning, followed by eight singles matches in the afternoon. Four foursomes matches were played on the Friday morning with a further eight singles in the afternoon. In all, 24 matches were played.

Each of the 24 matches was worth one point in the larger team competition. If a match was all square after the 18th hole, each side earned half a point toward their team total. The team that accumulated at least 12½ points won the competition.

Teams
Eight college golfers from Europe and the United States participated in the event.

Thursday's matches

Morning four-ball

Afternoon singles

Friday's matches

Morning foursomes

Afternoon singles

Michael Carter award
The Michael Carter Award winners were Jonas Enander Hedin and Michael Thompson.

References

External links
Palmer Cup official site

Arnold Palmer Cup
Golf tournaments in Scotland
Palmer Cup
Palmer Cup
Palmer Cup